Boris Dmitriyevich Andreyev (6 October 1940 - 9 July 2021) was a former Soviet cosmonaut. He retired in 1983 for medical reasons and subsequently did not fly on any missions into space. He was, however, given backup assignments on several flights.

Biography

Early life and education

Andreyev was born in Moscow, present day Russia, on October 6, 1940. He graduated from Moscow Bauman-Highschool with an engineering diploma in 1964.

Cosmonaut career

Andreyev was selected as a Soviet cosmonaut in March 1972. Although he never flew into space, he served as a backup crew member on the Soyuz 16, Soyuz 32, Soyuz 35, and Soyuz T-4 missions. He retired from the space program in September 1983 for medical reasons following a parachuting incident. He then worked in the flight control center as capsule communicator.

References

Soviet cosmonauts
1940 births
2021 deaths
Engineers from Moscow
Cosmonauts from Moscow